Filippo Volandri was the defending champion but chose to compete in the 2006 World Team Cup which was held in the same week.
Nikolay Davydenko defeated Andrei Pavel 6–3, 6–0 to win the 2006 Hypo Group Tennis International singles event.

Seeds

Draws

Finals

Top half

Bottom half

External links
Singles Draw
Qualifying Draw

Hypo Group Tennis International
2006 ATP Tour